Dennis Michael Collins (June 30, 1944 – February 6, 2015) was an American politician who served as the mayor of Toledo, Ohio, from 2014 until his death in 2015. An Independent, he was a member of the Toledo City Council from District 2 (2008-2014). In the 2013 mayoral election, Collins defeated incumbent Independent mayor Michael P. Bell, winning 55.37% of the total vote.

Education and personal life
A graduate of Libbey High School (1962), he held a Bachelor of Science degree in Human Resources Management and Natural Sciences (1975) and a Masters of Business Administration degree (1998) from the University of Toledo.

He was married to Sandy Drabik and had three daughters.

Coronary episode and death
On the afternoon of February 1, 2015, television news bulletins reported that Collins had been hospitalized with what was described as a "coronary episode". That night the mayor's spokesman announced that Collins was in critical condition after suffering a coronary arrest before being resuscitated. Because he was unable to perform his mayoral duties, Toledo City Council president Paula Hicks-Hudson was sworn in on February 1, 2015, as acting mayor. She is Toledo's first African American woman to lead the city. Collins died on February 6, 2015, at the age of 70.

References

Further reading

External links
 Office of the Mayor of Toledo official website
 D. Michael Collins Committee to Elect D. Michael Collins website
 
 

University of Toledo alumni
Mayors of Toledo, Ohio
Ohio city council members
1944 births
2015 deaths
Ohio Independents